Zdena Salivarová (born October 21, 1933) is a Czech-born writer and translator living in Canada.

She was born in Prague and studied script-writing at the Academy of Performing Arts in Prague. She came to Toronto in the year 1969 with her husband Josef Škvorecký following the Soviet invasion of Czechoslovakia.

During the 1960s, she worked as a singer and actress. In 1968, she published a collection of short stories Pánská jízda.

With her husband, she founded a publishing house in Toronto, 68 Publishers, which published Czech books that were banned in communist Czechoslovakia. Salivarová and her husband wrote Samožerbuch (1977) about the history of the publishing house.

She received the Egon Hostovský award in 1976. With her husband, she was named to the Order of the White Lion in 1990 for their work in promoting Czech literature.

Selected works 
 Honzlová (Summer in Prague), novel (1972)
 Nebe, peklo, ráj (Ashes, Ashes, All Fall Down), novel (1976)

Filmography 

 1969 End of a Priest - Anna
 1967 Mučedníci lásky
 1966 A Report on the Party and the Guests

References

External links 
 

1938 births
Living people
Czech novelists
Czech translators
French–Czech translators
Czechoslovak emigrants to Canada
Recipients of the Order of the White Lion
Writers from Prague
Czech women novelists
20th-century translators
20th-century women writers
Canadian publishers (people)